Toranagatti is a village in Belagavi district of Karnataka, India.

References

Villages in Belagavi district